Ganzhou District, formerly the separate city of Ganzhou or Kanchow, is a district in and the seat of the prefecture-level city of Zhangye in Gansu Province in the People's Republic of China, bordering Inner Mongolia to the north and northeast. Ganzhou was an important outpost in western China and, along with Suzhou (now the central district of Jiuquan), it is the namesake of the province. As a settlement, it is now known as Zhangye after the prefecture it heads. The name "Gansu" originates as a combination of Ganzhou and Suzhou.

History

Administrative divisions
Ganzhou District is divided to 5 subdistricts, 13 towns, 4 townships, 1 ethic township and 1 other.
Subdistricts

Towns

Townships

Ethnic townships
 Pingshanhu Mongol Township

Others
 Zhangye Economic and Technological Development Zone

See also
 List of administrative divisions of Gansu

References

 Official website (Chinese)

County-level divisions of Gansu
Zhangye